Harold Bartrum Osmond FRCO (19 January 1869 – 24 June 1948) was a composer and organist based in England.

Life
He was born in Southampton, on 19 January 1869, the child of Arthur Osmond (1828-1895) and Matilda Bartrum (1837-1919). He studied at the Guildhall School of Music under D. Beardwell, Henry Gadsby, and other Masters. He was awarded his FRCO in 1888.

He was conductor of the Broadstairs and St. Peter's Choral Societies. Later he was conductor of the Coventry Amateur Operatic Society.

He married twice: Firstly, Florence Stuart Peat (d. 1902). Secondly, Rosa Annie Pickering. This marriage produced three children:
Frances Noelle Osmond (1904-1965)
Arthur Harold Osmond (1908-1996)
Olive Mary Osmond (1909-1987)

Appointments

Organist at St Peter's Bethnal Green 1884 - 1886
Organist at St. Barnabas' Church, Homerton 1886 - 1889
Organist at St. Peter's Church, Thanet 1889 - 1918
Organist at Holy Trinity Church, Coventry 1918 - ????

Compositions

His chief compositions were:
Sacred Cantata, The Ascension 1886
Psalm 23, for baritone solo, chorus, and orchestra 1886
Communion Service in E 
Anthems, etc. 
Symphonic Suite for small orchestra, 1896

References

1869 births
1948 deaths
English organists
British male organists
English composers
Musicians from Southampton
Alumni of the Guildhall School of Music and Drama